Mahidolia mystacina, the flagfin prawn goby, flagfin shrimpgoby or smiling goby, is a species of goby native to the Indian Ocean and the Pacific Ocean from Delagoa Bay, Mozambique to the Society Islands and from southern Japan to Samoa and northern Australia. This species is a commensal with a species of alpheid shrimp, using its burrow as its home. This species can reach a length of  TL. This species can also be found in the aquarium trade. It is currently the only known member of its genus.

Its genus name Mahidolia is named in honour of Mahidol Adulyadej, Prince of Songkla who was the father of King Ananda Mahidol (Rama VIII) and King Bhumibol (Rama IX), as a supporter of fisheries in Siam (today's Thailand). It was first discovered at the mouth of the Chanthaburi River, Amphoe Laem Sing, Chanthaburi Province, Eastern Thailand by H. M. Smith.

References

External links
 
 Mahidolia mystacina @ fishesofaustralia.net.au

Gobiinae
Fish of Mozambique
Fish of Madagascar
Marine fish of Southeast Asia
Marine fish of Northern Australia
Taxa named by Achille Valenciennes
Fish described in 1837
Monotypic fish genera